Pranab Kumar Gogoi (19 August 1936 – 3 February 2020) was an Indian lawyer and politician from Assam belonging to Indian National Congress. He was elected four times as a legislator of the Assam Legislative Assembly. He also served as the speaker of the Assam Legislative Assembly and minister of the Government of Assam.

Early life and education 
Gogoi was born on 19 August 1936 in Guwahati to Girindra Nath Gogoi and Hiranyalata Gogoi. His father was a minister of the Government of Assam. He received LLB degree from Guwahati University in 1961.

Political career 
Gogoi was elected as a legislator of the Assam Legislative Assembly from Sibsagar in 2001. He was also elected from that constituency in 2006. He served as a minister of the Government of Assam from 2006 to 2011. In 2011 he was elected from Sibsagar too. He was appointed the speaker of the Assam Legislative Assembly on 6 June 2011. He served in the post till 28 May 2016. During this time he took steps for "Assamese" definition in 2015. After consultations with 53 organisations he recommended the year 1951 be taken as the cut off period for the definition of Assamese and National Register of Citizens for Assam. In 2016 he was elected as a legislator of the Assam Legislative Assembly from Sibsagar for the fourth consecutive time.

Personal life and death 
Gogoi was married to Mohini Gogoi. Together they had 3 sons - Manjir, Sameer and Prameer.

Gogoi died on 3 February 2020 at a private hospital in Guwahati at the age of 83. He was survived by his wife, his sons, their spouses and their children. Chief Minister Sarbananda Sonowal, former Chief Minister Tarun Gogoi, Ripun Bora and other politicians all paid tribute.

Funeral 
The mortal remains of Gogoi, wrapped in the national flag, were brought to his residence located at Red Cross Road on Tuesday night at around 7 PM. His mortal remains were taken to Rajiv Bhavan and Sibsagar Bar Association where Congress members and members of the bar association paid tribute.

Gogoi was cremated with full state honours at Hahchara Jathipatia village in Sivasagar district in presence of relatives and leaders from political parties. His mortal remains were cremated by his three sons Manjir, Sameer and Prameer at 2 PM amidst gun salute by Assam Police personnel. Hundreds of mourners came to the cremation site.  Leaders of different political parties and organizations laid wreaths on the mortal remains and a gun salute was given before the last rites. Leader of Opposition Debabrata Saikia, Rakibul Hussain, BJP leaders, administrative officials, including Sivasagar Deputy Commissioner Dr. MS Lakshmi Priya were present.

References

1936 births
2020 deaths
Indian National Congress politicians
Assam MLAs 2001–2006
Assam MLAs 2006–2011
Assam MLAs 2011–2016
Assam MLAs 2016–2021
Speakers of the Assam Legislative Assembly
State cabinet ministers of Assam
Gauhati University alumni
People from Sivasagar district
Indian lawyers